Franz Feldinger (22 August 1928 – 16 March 2009) was an Austrian footballer. He competed in the men's tournament at the 1952 Summer Olympics.

References

External links
 

1928 births
2009 deaths
Austrian footballers
Austria international footballers
Olympic footballers of Austria
Footballers at the 1952 Summer Olympics
Footballers from Salzburg
Association football midfielders
Austrian football managers
FC Red Bull Salzburg managers
FC Red Bull Salzburg players